The 2017 Nippon Professional Baseball (NPB) Draft was held on October 26, for the 53rd time at the Grand Prince Hotel Takanawa to assign amateur baseball players to the NPB. It was arranged with the special cooperation of Taisho Pharmaceutical Co. with official naming rights. The draft was officially called "The Professional Baseball Draft Meeting supported by Lipovitan D". 2017 marked the 5th consecutive year in which Taisho Pharmaceuticals had sponsored the event.

Summary 

Only the first round picks were allowed to be contested with all picks from the second round onward being based on table placing in the 2017 NPB season in a waiver system. Waiver priority was based on inter-league results. As the Pacific League teams came out on top against Central League opposition, Pacific League teams were given preference.  From the third round the order was reversed continuing in the same fashion until all picks were exhausted.

Apart from the selection of Katsuki Azuma by the Yokohama DeNA Baystars, all other picks in the first round went on to be contested being the most this had occurred since 2008.

87 new players were drafted with a further 28 development players selected.

First Round Contested Picks 

 Bolded teams indicate who won the right to negotiate contract following a lottery.
 In the first round, Katsuki Azuma (Pitcher) was selected by the Baystars without a bid lottery.
 In the second round, Hiroshi Suzuki (Pitcher) was selected by the Dragons , and Hiromasa Saito (Pitcher) by the Lions without a bid lottery.
 In the thrird round, Takuya Kuwahara (Pitcher) was selected by the Giants , and Hiroki Kondoh (Pitcher) by the Eagles without a bid lottery.
 In the fourth round, the last remaining the Hawks, selected Haruto Yoshizumi (Pitcher)
 List of selected players.

Selected Players 

The order of the teams is the order of second round waiver priority.
 Bolded After that, a developmental player who contracted as a registered player under control.
 List of selected players.

Chiba Lotte Marines

Tokyo Yakult Swallows

Hokkaido Nippon-Ham Fighters

Chunichi Dragons

Orix Buffaloes

Yomiuri Giants

Tohoku Rakuten Golden Eagles

Yokohama DeNA Baystars

Saitama Seibu Lions

Hanshin Tigers

Fukuoka SoftBank Hawks

Hiroshima Toyo Carp

References

External links 
 プロ野球ドラフト会議 supported by リポビタンD - NPB.jp Nippon Professional Baseball

Nippon Professional Baseball draft
Draft
Nippon Professional Baseball draft
Nippon Professional Baseball draft
Baseball in Japan
Sport in Tokyo
Events in Tokyo